Merha is a village in Badlapur, Jaunpur district, Varanasi division, Uttar Pradesh, India.

References

Villages in Jaunpur district